Fall is a 1997 American romantic film directed by, written by and starring Eric Schaeffer, alongside Amanda de Cadenet. The film was followed by a 2011 sequel After Fall, Winter.

Plot
Michael Shiver (Eric Schaeffer) is a cab driver in New York. One day, supermodel Sarah Easton (Amanda de Cadenet) enters his taxi and they have a short but intense exchange. A few days later, he sees her by chance when having dinner with his two close friends, and they have a short interaction.

The movie develops with the two of them becoming interested into each other and slowly falling in love while Sarah's husband is away in Rome for two months. Michael occasionally writes her love poems and surprises her with romantic gifts such as a thousand roses delivered to her hotel room in Spain, when Sarah went there to visit her husband.

Towards the end, there is an intense conflict between Sarah and Michael, in which Sarah says how Michael doesn't understand her life and that everything happens on his terms. Michael reveals that he was a writer and had known her kind of life, but did not feel fulfilled so gave up and became a cab driver instead. Sarah goes back to her husband and Michael sends her his best-selling book (which made him famous in the past) along with a last letter with which the film ends.

Cast

Eric Schaeffer - Michael
Amanda de Cadenet - Sarah
Rudolf Martin - Phillipe
Francie Swift - Robin
Lisa Vidal - Sally
Roberta Maxwell - Joan Alterman
Scarlett Johansson - Little Girl

References

External links
 
 

1997 films
1997 romantic drama films
American independent films
American romantic drama films
Films set in Manhattan
Films set in Paris
Films shot in New York City
Films shot in Paris
1997 independent films
1990s English-language films
Films directed by Eric Schaeffer
1990s American films